Mooney Township is an inactive township in Polk County, in the U.S. state of Missouri.

Mooney Township has the name of John Mooney, a pioneer settler.

References

Townships in Missouri
Townships in Polk County, Missouri